Giovanni Marcelo Narváez Narváez (born 1 July 1983) is a Chilean footballer that currently plays for Deportes Vallenar in the Chilean Second Division.

Club career
After starting professionally with Antofagasta in 2005 and playing for two seasons, Narváez joined San Marcos de Arica, where he had the most productive period of his career, scoring 16 goals in 91 appearances. In January 2010, he joined Coquimbo Unido and, after one season, returned to Antofagasta, where he won the first major honour of his career, the Apertura Primera B title.

In May 2012, Narváez was asked to resign from Antofagasta after making obscene gestures toward the club's supporters in a match against Rangers as an angry protest against his mid-game substitution for his former teammate, Pablo Lavandeira.

Honours

Club
Antofagasta
 Primera B de Chile: 2011 Apertura

References

External links
 
 Giovanni Narváez at Football-Lineups
 

1983 births
Living people
Chilean footballers
Coquimbo Unido footballers
Puerto Montt footballers
San Marcos de Arica footballers
C.D. Antofagasta footballers
Deportes Concepción (Chile) footballers
Santiago Morning footballers
Rangers de Talca footballers
Chilean Primera División players
Primera B de Chile players
Association football midfielders
People from Antofagasta